Phadia develops, manufactures and markets blood test systems to support the clinical diagnosis and monitoring of allergy, asthma and autoimmune diseases. The company is headquartered in Uppsala, Sweden. It has been owned by Thermo Fisher Scientific since 2011.

History
Originally part of the Pharmacia group of companies and an offshoot of the diagnostics division that developed out of Pfizer and Pharmacia & Upjohn (all Uppsala-based companies), Phadia was renamed in January 2006.

The first steps towards the present Phadia AB were taken in the mid 1960s. Three scientists working at Uppsala University Hospital, Leif Wide, Rolf Axén and Jerker Porath, then presented their ideas to use Pharmacia's separation medium Sephadex as the solid phase in immunodiagnostics tests and proposed a collaboration with the company for the commercial development. Pharmacia's management decided to go for the project and established a special R&D group for diagnostics products. In 1970 Pharmacia's first product, Phadebas Amylase Test, a test for the enzyme alpha-amylase, was launched.

At the same time an important medical discovery was made which would be of decisive importance to Phadia. Johansson and Bennich worked together with Wide to develop a method to measure the levels of the substance in blood samples. Eventually a clear connection was demonstrated between IgE antibodies and allergic symptoms. Johansson, Bennich and Wide then suggested that Pharmacia should use the findings to develop a commercial allergy test. This led to the ground-breaking product Phadebas RAST, which established the leading position that Phadia still maintains in the area of allergy testing.

Immunoglobulin E testing
Since the discovery of IgE in 1967, Phadia has pioneered the development of in vitro test systems for allergy (immunoglobulin E). These IgE tests have been followed by tests for IgG and IgA antibodies, as well as other analytes with applications in asthma, celiac disease and autoimmunity.

In addition, the ImmunoCAP testing system has revolutionized the level of automation and speed which these tests are processed. Based on the high binding capacity and solid phase technology, ImmunoCAP tests are both highly sensitive and highly specific.

See also
 Eczema
 Rhinitis
 Asthma
 Thyroid disease
 Diabetes
 Rheumatoid arthritis
 Systemic lupus erythematosus (SLE)

References
 Saarinen U M, et al. Lancet 1995;346:1065-1069
 De Backer. Am J Respir 1996;153:A336

Health care companies of Sweden
Blood tests
2011 mergers and acquisitions